Edward Wolff is an American economist.

Ed or Edward Wolff may also refer to:

Ed Wolff (actor), actor in The Phantom Creeps and The Colossus of New York
Edward Wolff (composer) of "24 Études en forme de Préludes", Op. 20, which is music written in all 24 major and minor keys

See also
Edward Wolfe (disambiguation)